DX is the only studio album by American hip hop record production duo Friendzone. It was released on October 9, 2013. A music video was created for "Poly".

In an interview with Fact, James Laurence said, "DX is an album 100%, this is our heart and soul." Dylan Reznick said, "I wanted to make an album that would make people's heads spin, make them rethink their ideas about music a little."

Critical reception
Fact placed the album at number 47 on the "50 Best Albums of 2013" list. Writing for Fact, John Twells described it as "the most distilled example of their sound – a sunny, hopeful fusion of 16-bit melodies, anime joy, IDM fuzz and Atlanta beats." Cokemachineglow placed the album at number 3 on the "Top 30 Albums 2013" list. Brent Ables of Cokemachineglow wrote, "it marks their progression from top-notch producers to genuine composers in their own right."

Track listing

References

External links
 
 

2013 debut albums
Friendzone albums